Mike Flood may refer to:

Mike Flood (politician) (born 1975), member of U.S. House of Representatives from Nebraska
Mike Flood, a character in Fireman Sam
MIKE FLOOD, computer program
Michael Flood, sociologist

Flood, Mike